Danny Garibay is a Grammy-nominated American record producer, songwriter, and mix engineer based in Los Angeles, California.

Career
Garibay was born and raised in Los Angeles, California.

Early in his career as a music producer, Garibay joined Troy Carter's company, Atom Factory Entertainment. While at Atom Factory, Garibay helped bring The Ceremonies to Carter, who eventually signed them on to his company in 2012. This initial collaboration then subsequently led to a partnership to sign The Ceremonies to Capitol Records.

Garibay has also worked with Alicia Lemke, also known as Alice and the Glass Lake, on her album Chimaera. Lemke passed away from leukemia in August 2015, after which Garibay took five months to perfect the posthumous album and work on tracks such as "Coals".

Over the course of his career, Garibay has also collaborated with musical artists Simon Curtis, Cory Henry, Kossisko, Sky Keller, Semi Precious Weapons, G-Eazy, Kiesza, and many other well-known artists.

Garibay works in his Hollywood recording/mixing studio, operating under the production company name lo͞omənəs.

Awards and nominations

Grammy Awards

Discography
Danny Garibay's discography is as follows.

See also
Troy Carter (music industry)

References

External links
lo͞omənəs website
AllMusic profile
Instagram profile

Living people
Year of birth missing (living people)
American male songwriters
Record producers from Los Angeles